Yevgeny Kafelnikov and Nenad Zimonjić were the defending champions but only Kafelnikov competed that year with Wayne Ferreira.

Ferreira and Kafelnikov lost in the first round to Jiří Novák and David Rikl.

Martin Damm and Radek Štěpánek won in the final 6–3, 6–2 against Novák and Rikl.

Seeds

  Jiří Novák /  David Rikl (final)
  Wayne Black /  Kevin Ullyett (first round)
  Petr Pála /  Pavel Vízner (semifinals)
  Joshua Eagle /  Andrew Florent (first round)

Draw

External links
 2001 CA-TennisTrophy Doubles draw

Vienna Open
2001 ATP Tour
2001 in Austrian tennis